Aleksandr Semyonovich Kronrod (October 22, 1921 – October 6, 1986) was a Soviet mathematician and computer scientist, best known for the Gauss–Kronrod quadrature formula which he published in 1964. Earlier, he worked on computational solutions of problems emerging in theoretical physics. He is also known for his contributions to economics, specifically for proposing corrections and calculating price formation for the USSR. Later, Kronrod gave his fortune and life to medicine to care for terminal cancer patients. Kronrod is remembered for his captivating personality and was admired as a student, teacher and leader.

He is the author of several well known books, including "Nodes and weights of quadrature formulas. Sixteen-place tables" and "Conversations on Programming". A biographer wrote Kronrod gave ideas "away left and right, quite honestly being convinced that the authorship belongs to the one who implements them."

Education
Kronrod was born in Moscow. Growing up, he studied math with D. O. Shklyarsky in school and in 1938 entered the Department of Mechanics and Mathematics at Moscow State University. He did his first independent mathematical work as a freshman with Professor Alexander Gelfond. Kronrod was honored as a student with the first prize of the Moscow Mathematical Society and was the only person to win the prize twice.

During World War II he was rejected for military service because at the time graduate level students were exempt. They did help to build trenches around Moscow, and when he returned, Kronrod reapplied and was accepted. He served twice, and was injured twice. He was awarded several medals, including Order of the Red Star. The second injury in 1943 hospitalised him for a year and he was discharged from the army in 1944. This injury made him an invalid of sorts for life.

Kronrod was married and about this time his son was born. During next four years he continued his studies at the University, simultaneously working at the Atomic Energy Kurchatov Institute. There he chose to leave pure mathematics and pursue computational mathematics.

In his last undergraduate year, Kronrod studied with Nikolai Luzin the teacher of many of the Soviet Union's finest scientists. Kronrod and Georgy Adelson-Velsky were colleagues and Luzin's last students. Like his teacher, Kronrod led a series of supplementary seminars for younger mathematics students. Unusually for the time, instead of students merely reporting on the content of courses, Kronrod made his students undertake training exercises, even proving basic theorems themselves. The preparation required for this reduced the numbers of participants, but those who remained, including Robert Minlos and Anatoli Vitushkin, derived great benefit. Vitushkin described him as "witty and friendly". At his own request, Kronrod was called simply "Sasha" by his students. He was considered to be a prophet in his field. The Kronod circle met between 1946 and 1953. Kronrod's position was formally at the Institute of Physics, which meant that his students had to register with other advisers, accounting for the decline of the circle into a series of friendly meetings. When he defended thesis in 1949, his committee including Mstislav Keldysh, Andrey Kolmogorov and Dmitrii Menshov bypassed the Candidate of Sciences degree and awarded him a Doctor of Sciences degree in the physical-mathematical sciences.

Kronrod taught at the Moscow Pedagogical Institute. Evgenii Landis was a student, early collaborator and one of his biographers.

During the 1960s he worked on mathematics education in high schools by organizing courses and teaching methods.

Computer science

Kronod played an important role in building the first major Russian computer, Relay Computer RVM-1, though he liked to say his colleague N.I. Bessonov was the sole inventor.

At the Moscow Institute for Theoretical and Experimental Physics (ITEF or ITEP) during 1950–1955 Kronod collaborated with physicists, among them Isaak Pomeranchuk and Lev Landau. For providing theoretical physics with numerical solutions he received the Stalin Prize and an Order of the Red Banner of Labour.

In 1955, he first used an electronic computer at the Krzhizhanovsky laboratory of the Institute of Energy of the Academy of Sciences of the Soviet Union, later called the Institute for Electronic Control Machines.

He directed the mathematics division of ITEP. They could surpass the results achieved outside the USSR by far faster machines, in the case of CERN in Geneva, five hundred times faster. Requests for computation were analyzed and sometimes solved by other means. The equipment was maintained and there were almost no hardware malfunctions. A policy said finished programs had to be re-examined if they ran for more than ten minutes.

 Excerpt from the form for ITEP mathematics programs, in "Remembering A. S. Kronrod" by E.M. Landis and I.M. Yaglom.

Kronrod rewarded accuracy. He held what today are controversial views on the role of gender in computing. He employed women in ITEP's coding and card punching groups, believing that female computing staff members are more accurate than males. He also believed that in order to think, the male scientists qualified to use the computers needed to be free from operating them. The women did the input and quality assurance side by side with the men and for each month without an error received a 20% raise in salary.

He applied computing resources to the USSR planned economy and to cancer research. He served with Leonid Kantorovich and others on a cabinet ministry commission and oversaw the computation of the country's material expenditures to correct price formation. Kronrod's student V. D. Belkin further developed this work. At the Gertsen cancer research institute during the 1960s, with his student P. E. Kunin he studied the differential diagnostics of lung cancer and pneumonia to help doctors determine when surgery is needed.

Artificial intelligence
Kronrod had a profound interest in artificial intelligence known in the USSR at the time as heuristic programming. He is well known for saying, "chess is the Drosophila of artificial intelligence." This quote graces the top of the American Association for Artificial Intelligence "Games & Puzzles" chess home page.

In 1965, ITEP challenged and in 1966–1967 defeated the American chess program Kotok-McCarthy. The developers included Adelson-Velsky who used Alexander Brudno's adversarial search algorithm and a "general recursive search scheme" by Kronrod. They were advised by Russian chess master A.R. Bitman and world champion Mikhail Botvinnik in what was the first test of Shannon brute force vs. selective search.

Kronrod's participation came at great cost. The physics users at ITEP complained, thinking that the lab was being used for game playing, when the division was writing the Crazy Eights card game and chess trying to teach a machine to think.

End of a career
When the Communist Party reprimanded him in 1968 for cosigning a letter with many mathematicians in defense of the mathematician and logician Alexander Esenin-Volpin, a son of the poet Sergei Yesenin, the physicists were able to oust him from ITEP. He was also fired from his professorship.

He then directed the mathematics laboratory at the Central Scientific Research Institute of Patent Information (CNIIPI) where he proposed patent reform to stimulate inventions. After gaining support he lost this position to an unsympathetic director. His last position was heading a Central Geophysical Expedition laboratory that processed drilling data where he made calculations for gas and oil exploration, but he was not challenged by this work. He re-examined his goals and soon changed course.

Medicine

Kronrod decided that his best work was to help others and most importantly the terminally ill. He spent his fortune developing milil from a sour milk extract for cancer patients, to fill a shortage of anabol, an expensive drug developed in small quantities by his acquaintance Bogdanov in Bulgaria. He was promised but never acquired an animal testing laboratory so he tested the medicine on himself. Kronrod had no medical degree but he was well-informed in medicine. Milil was a last resort for seriously ill patients and was administered by physicians in one case in a hospital ward A.A. Vishnevskiy reserved for treatments by Kronrod's method. Kronrod himself never gave the drug to patients and through physicians gave it away free. The drug was unapproved and a criminal case was brought against him. He regained his research records when a relative of the plaintiff required milil for treatment and the case was dismissed.

He slowly recovered when a stroke took his speech and ability to read and write but was forced to resign at the Central Geophysical Expedition and stop all work on math. He saved his own life by asking to be soaked in a tub of very hot water for several hours after a second stroke. He died on 6 October 1986 of a third stroke.

Notes

References
  (also available in Russian)

External links

 

Kronrod, Aleksandr
Kronrod, Aleksandr
20th-century Russian mathematicians
Mathematicians from Moscow
Institute for Theoretical and Experimental Physics alumni
Moscow State University alumni
Stalin Prize winners
Recipients of the Order of the Red Banner of Labour
Recipients of the Order of the Red Star
Computer chess people
Kronrod, Aleksandr
Jewish scientists
Russian computer scientists
Russian mathematicians
Kronrod, Aleksandr
Kronrod, Aleksandr
Burials at Donskoye Cemetery